John Barnes Linnett (born ) was a British lithograph printer based in Birmingham, England. Although the French Pierre-Hubert Desvignes is generally credited with being the inventor of the flip book, Linnett was the first to patent the invention, in 1868, under the name of 'e'kineograph''.

He was born in Austrey, Warwickshire.

Linnett died of pneumonia. His wife sold the patent to an American.

References

1830s births
Year of death missing
English printers
English inventors
People from Birmingham, West Midlands
History of film
Deaths from pneumonia